March into the Sea is the second EP by Chicago-based instrumental metal band Pelican, released in 2005 by Hydra Head Records. The title track is the original version of the shortened song "March to the Sea" from their 2005 album The Fire in Our Throats Will Beckon the Thaw, which was released just a month and a half later. The second track is a Justin Broadrick remix of "Angel Tears", a song from their 2003 debut full-length Australasia.

Track listing 
 "March into the Sea" – 20:28
 "Angel Tears" (J. K. Broadrick remix) – 12:22

Personnel 
Band members
 Trevor de Brauw – guitar
 Bryan Herweg – bass
 Larry Herweg – drums
 Laurent Schroeder-Lebec – guitar

Other personnel

 Chris de Brauw – flute
 Greg Norman – mixing
 Nick Zampiello – mastering
 Nathan Baker – photography
 Paul Jeffrey – layout

References 

Pelican (band) albums
2005 EPs
Hydra Head Records EPs